The Christiansted Historic District is a  historic district in Christiansted, Saint Croix, Virgin Islands, which was listed on the National Register of Historic Places in 1976.  It included 253 contributing buildings and two contributing sites.

It includes the Christiansted National Historic Site, also listed on the National Register.  It includes Renaissance Revival and Danish West Indian vernacular architecture.

The town of Christiansted was platted in a grid pattern in 1734 by Frederik Moth, who later was the first Danish
governor of St. Croix.

References

National Register of Historic Places in the United States Virgin Islands
Renaissance Revival architecture in the United States